This was the first edition of the event.

Kristian Pless and Aisam-ul-Haq Qureshi won the title, defeating Ivo Heuberger and Ville Liukko 6–4, 6–4 in the final.

Seeds

Draw

References
 Draws on ITF Site

Neridé Prague Indoor